Odăile is a commune in Buzău County, Muntenia, Romania. It is composed of ten villages: Capu Satului, Corneanu, Gorâni, Lacu, Odăile, Piatra Albă, Posobești, Scoroșești, Valea Fântânei and Valea Ștefanului.

Notes

Communes in Buzău County
Localities in Muntenia